Hermann Bley (6 May 1936 – 28 May 2011) was a German footballer.

External links

1936 births
2011 deaths
German footballers
East German footballers
East Germany international footballers
1. FC Frankfurt players
Berliner FC Dynamo players
DDR-Oberliga players
Association football midfielders